is a manga series by . The series is published in Japan by Kodansha and by Chuang Yi in English in Singapore. A live-action drama airs on TV Tokyo.

The story stars , an overweight girl who was rejected by her ex-boyfriend because of her weight. She enrolls in a beauty program where she hopes of obtaining a perfect figure.

Cast
The drama cast is:
 Yumi Sugimoto - 
 Aoi Nakamura - 
 Takumi Saito - 
 Hiroyuki Ikeuchi - 
 Kazuhiro Ozawa - 
 Toshiki Kashu -

References

External links

 Boys Esté at TV Tokyo

2004 manga
Kodansha manga
Shōjo manga
TV Tokyo original programming